Justice Holden may refer to:

Edwin M. Holden, associate justice of the Idaho Supreme Court
Horace Moore Holden (1866–1936), associate justice of the Supreme Court of Georgia
James Stuart Holden, associate justice and chief justice of the Vermont Supreme Court
John Burt Holden, associate justice of the Supreme Court of Mississippi
Thomas Holden (general), associate justice of the Rhode Island Supreme Court